Thomas Jefferson Barr (1812 – March 27, 1881) was an American politician and a U.S. Representative from New York, serving one term from 1859 to 1861.

Biography
Born in New York City, New York in 1812, Barr attended the public schools.

Career
Barr moved to Scotch Plains, New Jersey in 1835, and conducted a roadhouse. He returned to New York City in 1842 and was Assistant Alderman from the Sixth Ward in 1849 and 1850, and Alderman in 1852 and 1853. He was a member of the New York State Senate for the third district in 1854 and 1855.

Elected on January 6, 1859, as an Independent Democrat to the 35th United States Congress to fill the vacancy caused by the resignation of John Kelly, and was re-elected to the 36th United States Congress, Barr was U.S. Representative for the fourth district of New York and held office from January 17, 1859, to March 3, 1861.

Appointed a New York City Police Commissioner in 1870, Barr served until 1873, when the police board was abolished. Subsequently, he was employed in the office of the Collector of the Port of New York.

Death
Barr died in New York, New York County, New York, on March 27, 1881 (age about 68 years). He is interred at Calvary Cemetery, Woodside, New York.

References

External links
 

1812 births
1881 deaths
Democratic Party New York (state) state senators
People from Scotch Plains, New Jersey
New York City Council members
Democratic Party members of the United States House of Representatives from New York (state)
19th-century American politicians